Horqueta is a city of Paraguay, in the department of Concepción, located 50 kilometers from Concepción City and 428 kilometers from Asunción. It is established in a hill.

Toponimy 
The name of the city has its origin in the name of an intersection of roads called "Tapé Horqueta", where carts camped after long journeys.

Geography 
The town of Horqueta it is settled on a hill, after the intersection of roads.

Climate 
The temperature reaches 40 °C in summer and drops to −2 °C in winter. The average is 20 °C. The time of abundant rains is November, December and January, and the dry season is from June to September. The winds come from the North, East and South-East.

Demography 
Horqueta has a population of 55,882 inhabitants, 28,936 men and 26,947 women, according to the General Direction of Statistics, Poll and Census.

History 
The city started with a chapel, in the 18th century, founded officially in 1793. It was the first city with a pedestrian street in the country.

It is the second most important city in the Concepción department.

Economy 
In this region the most important economical activity is the agriculture, there are plantations of cotton plants, spurge, beans, manioc, corn, fruits. There also are yerba mate mills, oil industries, forestall exploit and cotton desmotadora.

It is considered the "National Capital of Ka’a He’e" (a sweetener plant).

Another important activity is the craftsmanship of leather and also the cattle.

Transportation 
Located 428 kilometers from Asunción, it is possible to access to the city traveling the Route No. 3 "Gral. Elizardo Aquino" and reaching Yby Yau taking Route No. 5 "Gral. Bernardino Caballero".

From Horqueta, it is possible to access to the city Tacuatí, in San Pedro.

Tourism 
45 kilometers from Concepción, by the Route to Vallemí, in the banks of the Aquidabán River, there is the Paso Horqueta, a place with beaches of white sand and ideal for camping.

The Bridge Paso Horqueta is a monumental and picturesque wood bridge over the river.

References 
 Geografía Ilustrada del Paraguay, Distribuidora Arami SRL; 2007. 
 Geografía del Paraguay, Primera Edición 1999, Editorial Hispana Paraguay SRL.

External links 
Secretaria Nacional de Turismo
Dirección General de Estadísticas, Encuestas y Censos
World Gazeteer: Paraguay – World-Gazetteer.com

Populated places in Concepción Department, Paraguay